John Wishart may refer to:

John Wishart (bishop) (died 1338), bishop of Glasgow
John Wishart of Pitarrow (d. 1576), Scottish lawyer and politician
John Wishart (surgeon) (1850–1926), Canadian surgeon
John Wishart (statistician) (1898–1956), Scottish statistician
John Henry Wishart (1781–1834), Scottish ophthalmic surgeon